Picea sitchensis, the Sitka spruce, is a large, coniferous, evergreen tree growing to almost  tall, with a trunk diameter at breast height that can exceed 5 m (16 ft). It is by far the largest species of spruce and the fifth-largest conifer in the world (behind giant sequoia, coast redwood, kauri, and western red cedar), and the third-tallest conifer species (after coast redwood and coast Douglas fir). The Sitka spruce is one of the few species documented to exceed  in height. Its name is derived from the community of Sitka in southeast Alaska, where it is prevalent. Its range hugs the western coast of Canada and the US, continuing south into northernmost California.

Description
The inner bark is reddish-brown. The shoots are very pale buff-brown, almost white, and glabrous (hairless), but with prominent pulvini. The leaves are stiff, sharp, and needle-like, 15–25 millimeters long, flattened in cross-section, dark glaucous blue-green above with two or three thin lines of stomata, and blue-white below with two dense bands of stomata.

They are green or reddish, maturing pale brown 5–7 months after pollination.

Size
More than a century of logging has left only a remnant of the spruce forest. The largest trees were cut long before careful measurements could be made.

Age
Sitka spruce is a long-lived tree, with individuals over 700 years old known. Because it grows rapidly under favorable conditions, large size may not indicate exceptional age. The Queets Spruce has been estimated to be only 350 to 450 years old, but adds more than a cubic meter of wood each year.

Root system
Because it grows in extremely wet and poorly-drained soil, the Sitka spruce has a shallow root system with long lateral roots and few branchings. This also makes it susceptible to wind throw.

Taxonomy
DNA analysis has shown that only P. breweriana has a more basal position than Sitka spruce to the rest of the spruce. The other 33 species of spruce are more derived, which suggests that Picea originated in North America.

Distribution and habitat

Sitka spruce is native to the west coast of North America, with its northwestern limit on Kenai Peninsula, Alaska, and its southeastern limit near Fort Bragg in northern California. It is closely associated with the temperate rainforests and is found within a few kilometers of the coast in the southern portion of its range.

It is tolerant to salty spray common in coastal dune habitat, such as at Cape Disappointment State Park in Washington, and prefers soils high in magnesium, calcium, and phosphorus.

Sitka spruce has been introduced to Europe as a lumber tree, and was first planted there in the 19th century. Sitka spruce plantations have become a dominant forest type in Great Britain and Ireland, making up 25% of forest cover in the former and 52% in the latter. Sitka spruce woodland is also present in France and Denmark, and the plant was introduced to Iceland and Norway in the early 20th century. Observations of Sitka spruce along the Norwegian coast have shown the species to be growing 25-100% faster than the native Norway spruce there, even as far north as Vesterålen, and Sitka spruces planted along the southwest coast of Norway are growing fastest among the Sitka plantations in Europe.

A 9-metre-tall, 100-year-old Sitka spruce growing in the middle of the permanently uninhabited sub-antarctic Campbell Island has been recognised by the Guinness World Records as the "most remote tree in the world".

Ecology

Value to wildlife 
Sitka spruce provides critical habitat for a large variety of mammals, birds, reptiles, and amphibians. Its thick, sharp needles are poor browse for ungulates, and only the new spring growth is eaten. However, in Alaska and British Columbia the needles of Picea sitchensis comprise up to 90% of the winter diet of blue grouse.

Lichen-forming fungi Helocarpon lesdainii  is found on Picea sitchensis trees in Harris Beach State Park, Oregon, USA.

It provides cover and hiding places for a large variety of mammals, and good nesting and roosting habitat for birds. Sitka deer require old-growth Sitka spruce forests for winter habitat, as the extensive foliage holds a significant percentage of fallen snow in a given area, thus allowing for better understory browsing and easier migration for terrestrial animals. Cavity nesting birds favor Sitka spruce snags, and the tree is used by bald eagles, and peregrine falcons as nesting habitat.

Successional status 
Sitka spruce is shade tolerant but not as much as its competitors, preferring full sun if possible. It is a pioneer on landslides, sand dunes, uplifted beaches, and deglaciated terrain. However, it is a climax species in coastal forests, where it can become dominant.

Fire ecology
Due to the prevalence of Sitka spruce in cool, wet climates, its thin bark and shallow root system are not adapted to resist fire damage and it is thus very susceptible. Sitka spruce forests have a fire regime of severe crown or surface fires on long intervals, (150 to 350+ years) which results in total stand replacement. Sitka spruce recolonizes burned sites via wind-dispersed seed from adjacent unburned forests.

Uses
The root bark of Sitka spruce trees is used in Native Alaskan basket-weaving designs and for rain hats. The pitch was used for caulking, chewing, and its medicinal properties. Native Americans heated and plied the roots to make cord. The resin was used as glue and for waterproofing. Natives and pioneers split off shakes for construction use. The wood is light and relatively strong.

Sitka spruce is of major importance in forestry for timber and paper production. It is naturalized in some parts of Ireland and Great Britain, where it was introduced in 1831 by David Douglas, and New Zealand, though not so extensively as to be considered invasive. Sitka spruce is also planted extensively in Denmark, Norway, and Iceland. In Norway, Sitka spruce was introduced in the early 1900s. An estimated  have been planted in Norway, mainly along the coast from Vest-Agder in the south to Troms in the north. It is more tolerant to wind and saline ocean air, and grows faster than the native Norway spruce. But in Norway, the Sitka spruce is now considered an invasive species, and effort to get rid of it is being made.

The resonant wood is used widely in piano, harp, violin, and guitar manufacture, as its high strength-to-weight ratio and regular, knot-free rings make it an excellent conductor of sound. For these reasons, the wood is also an important material for sailboat spars, and aircraft wing spars (including flying models). The Wright brothers' Flyer was built using Sitka spruce, as were many aircraft before World War II; during that war, aircraft such as the British Mosquito used it as a substitute for strategically important aluminium.

Newly grown tips of Sitka spruce branches are used to flavor spruce beer and are boiled to make syrup.

Culture 

A unique specimen with golden foliage that used to grow on Haida Gwaii, known as Kiidk'yaas or "The Golden Spruce", is sacred to the Haida First Nations people. It was illegally felled in 1997 by Grant Hadwin, although saplings grown from cuttings can now be found near its original site.

Chemistry 
The stilbene glucosides astringin, isorhapontin, and piceid can be found in the bark of the Sitka spruce.

Burls
In the Olympic National Forest in Washington, Sitka spruce trees near the ocean sometimes develop burls.

According to a guidebook entitled Olympic Peninsula, "Damage to the tip or the bud of a Sitka spruce causes the growth cells to divide more rapidly than normal to form this swelling or burl. Even though the burls may look menacing, they do not affect the overall tree growth."

See also 
 List of tallest trees

References

External links

 Picea sitchensis - information, genetic conservation units and related resources. European Forest Genetic Resources Programme (EUFORGEN) 
Gymnosperm Database
Arboretum de Villardebelle - photos of cones of Picea sitchensis and related spruces
Prof Stephen Sillett's webpage with photos taken during canopy research.
Description of Sitka Spruce in forestry (PDF) by US Department of Agriculture.
Picea Sitchinesis 'Octopus tree'

Pacific temperate rainforests
sitchensis
Trees of the West Coast of the United States
Trees of the Southwestern United States
Trees of the Northwestern United States
Trees of Alaska
Trees of British Columbia
Trees of mild maritime climate
Trees of subpolar oceanic climate
Least concern flora of the United States
Trees of the United States
Trees of Western Canada
Trees of Eastern Canada
Trees of Subarctic America
Symbols of Alaska